Ochtinská Aragonite Cave is a unique aragonite cave situated in southern Slovakia, near Rožňava. Although only 300 m long, it is famous for its rare aragonite formations.

Description
There are only three aragonite caves discovered in the world so far.

In the so-called Milky Way Hall, the main attraction of the cave, white branches and clusters of aragonite shine like stars in the Milky Way. The cave was discovered by Martin Cangár and Jiri Prosek in 1954 and opened to the public in 1972. Along with other caves of the Slovak Karst, it is included in the UNESCO World Heritage list as a component of Caves of Aggtelek Karst and Slovak Karst site.

See also
List of caves in Slovakia

Gallery

References

External links

 Official site with pictures, map of the cave, and contact information

Show caves in Slovakia
World Heritage Sites in Slovakia
Geography of Košice Region
Tourist attractions in Košice Region
Caves of Aggtelek Karst and Slovak Karst